Luciobarbus mursa is a species of ray-finned fish in the genus Luciobarbus from freshwater habitats in Central Asia and Iran.

References 

 

Luciobarbus
Fish described in 1773
Taxa named by Johann Anton Güldenstädt